Diemerbroek is a village in the Dutch province of Utrecht.

The statistical district "Diemerbroek", which covers the village and the surrounding countryside, has a population of around 150.

References

Populated places in Utrecht (province)
Municipalities of Utrecht (province)